Squads for the Football at the 1970 Asian Games played in Bangkok, Thailand.

Group A

Head coach:  G M H Basha

Head coach:  Seraniw Chinwala

Head coach:Karl Heinz Weigang

Group B

Head coach:  Shunichiro Okano

Head coach:  U Pe Tin

Head coach:

Head coach:

Group C

Head coach:  Han Hong-ki

Head coach:  Djamiat Dalhar

Head coach:  Igor Netto

References

External links
https://web.archive.org/web/20140102232311/http://rdfc.com.ne.kr/int/skor-intres-1970.html

1970
1970